is the pen name of a duo of female Japanese comic book artists. When writing original works, the pen name is spelled as 

The artists have worked together since 1991 and have chosen not to reveal their real names.

Bibliography
 The Dragon Dreams of Twilight (2011 manga) 
 Astro Boy (2003 manga)
 Nazca
 The Legend of Zelda manga series
 The Legend of Zelda: Twilight Princess
 Gliding Reki, a jury recommendation from the 2007 Japan Media Arts Festival
 Gold Ring (Written by Qais Sedki, drawn by Himekawa)

References

External links 
  
 

Manga artists
Women manga artists
Japanese female comics artists
21st-century Japanese women writers
Living people
Year of birth missing (living people)